Sai-So: The Remix Project is the first remix album by Japan-based Kodo.

Track listing

 Strobe's nanafushi (Satori Mix) - 5:45
 Ibuki Reconstruction・DJ Krush - 3:31
 Wax Off・David Beal, David Baron & Lindsay Jehan - 4:03
 Kevin Yost's Deep & Ethnic Mix - 7:29
 Wax On・Kasz & David Beal - 3:54
 Inteligente's Nobi (Kashikoi Taiko To Basu Mix) - 7:02
 Strobe's The Hunted (Kannagara Mix) - 3:41
 Bill Laswell's Nanafushi - 9:07
 Bill Laswell's The Hunted - 6:22
 Strobe's Satori Beats - 3:08
 Strobe's Samurai Dub

Remix albums by Japanese artists
1999 remix albums